Arise or arose may refer to:
Ghost in the Shell: Arise, a 2013 series of films based on the manga by Masamune Shirow
Arise (horse) (born 1946), American Thoroughbred racehorse
Arise (film), a 2010 feature film documentary
|Arise!: the SubGenius Video, a 1992 comedic documentary covering the Church of the SubGenius
Arise India, an electronic manufacturing company in India
Arise News, a world news TV channel

Music
Arise (band), a Swedish heavy metal band
Arise! (Amebix album), 1985
Arise Volume 3, a 2009 album by Rebellion
Arise (Planetshakers album)
Arise (Sepultura album), 1991
Arise (Zara McFarlane album), 2017

Songs 
"Arise" (Sepultura song), 1991
"Arise" (Flyleaf song)
"Arise!", an alternate name for "March of the Volunteers", the Chinese national anthem
"Arise", a song by Avalon from the album Reborn
"Arise", a song by Chevelle from the album Hats Off to the Bull
"Arise", a song by Samuel E. Wright from the Disney 1990 album Sebastian from The Little Mermaid
"Arise!", a song by Armenian composer Robert Amirkhanyan
"Arose", a song by Eminem from the album Revival

Acronym
ARISE may refer to:
ARISE Detroit!, a coalition of community groups in Detroit
ARISE, an Anti-Racism, Imperialism, Sectarianism and Exploitation campaign organised by Ógra Shinn Féin